Church of the Nativity of the Theotokos, Viazivka was a wooden Orthodox church in the village of Viazivka, Narodychi Raion, Zhytomyr Oblast, Ukraine. Also known as Покровська церква, dedicated to the Intercession of the Theotokos. It had the statute of an architectural monument of national importance.

The church was built in 1862 by local people and priests.

In 2012, on the eve of the 150th anniversary of its creation, the church was looted.

On 7 March 2022, during the 2022 Russian invasion of Ukraine, the church was destroyed by Russian soldiers, with the only surviving structure being the belfry.

Gallery

References 

1862 establishments in Ukraine
2022 disestablishments in Ukraine
Attacks on churches in Europe
Buildings and structures in Zhytomyr Oblast
Wooden churches in Ukraine
Ukrainian Orthodox Church (Moscow Patriarchate) church buildings
Buildings and structures destroyed during the 2022 Russian invasion of Ukraine
Demolished churches in Ukraine